Stuart Evans (born 14 June 1963) is a Welsh former rugby union and rugby league player who played from the 1980s up until the early 2000s. Born in Neath in June 1963, Evans played for several rugby union clubs, including British Steel, for whom he once worked, Resolven, Swansea, Western Suburbs, Neath and Barbarian F.C. Between 1985 and 1987, Evans played for the Wales national rugby union team on nine occasions, and played in the 1987 Rugby World Cup. In September 1987 he switched codes to rugby league, joining St. Helens

Evans also took up a career in coaching the game after he retired from his long and successful professional playing career. Having coached up till 2019

John Player Special Trophy Final appearances
Stuart Evans played as an interchange/substitute, i.e. number 15, (replacing  Peter Souto) in St. Helens' 15–14 victory over Leeds in the 1987–88 John Player Special Trophy Final during the 1987–88 season at Central Park, Wigan on Saturday 9 January 1988.

A French championship Title private following a refereeing error with Grenoble 1993 
He has played for the FC Grenoble and despite overpowering pack called the Mammoths of Grenoble his club tilts on the score of 14–11.
A try on his part is also refused in Grenoble and the decisive try by Gary Whetton was awarded by the referee, Daniel Salles, when in fact the defender Franck Hueber from Grenoble touched down the ball first in his try zone.
This error gave the title to Castres Olympique. Salles admitted the error 13 years later.
Jacques Fouroux the coach of FC Grenoble in conflict with the Federation and who was already suspicious before the match of the referee cry out conspiracy.

Honours
French premiership:
FC Grenoble: 1993 Runners-up

References

External links
 
 Profile at saints.org.uk

1963 births
Living people
Barbarian F.C. players
FC Grenoble players
Neath RFC players
Resolven RFC players
Rugby league players from Neath
Rugby league props
Rugby union players from Neath
Rugby union props
St Helens R.F.C. players
Swansea RFC players
Wales international rugby union players
Welsh rugby league players
Welsh rugby union players